Charles Samuel Lafayette Alexander Taylor, commonly known as C. S. L. A. Taylor was an American lieutenant colonel and firefighter of the North Carolina National Guard. He was known for being one of the first black colonels during the Spanish–American War, commanding the 3rd North Carolina Volunteer Infantry Regiment. He was also known as a major figure within the Charlotte firefighters.

Childhood
Taylor was born in 1854 as a slave within South Carolina.. For most of his childhood, he was enslaved at Union County, North Carolina and worked as a shoemaker. During the American Civil War, the Confederate contract forced Taylor to continue working on shoes, primarily making them out of either cloth or wood due to the leather shortage.

Reconstruction
After the war, Taylor studied at several Quaker schools and opened up a barber shop at East Trade Street, Charlotte. During this time, he also served as a fireman as he served as the secretary of the Neptune Volunteer Fire Company which consisted of former slaves and freedmen. He eventually served in numerous state and national fire service organizations, becoming the Financial Secretary of the North Carolina Colored Volunteer Firemen’s Association on May 12, 1891, and would hold that office for 18 years before assuming presidency in the late 1920s and continued to involve himself in the organization until his death. He gained enough prominence within Charlotte that from May 4, 1885, to May 2, 1887, he served as an alderman representing the third ward of the city. He also served as a ballroom dancer, teaching ballroom dancing to white women within Charlotte.

Military career
Taylor was also involved in military service as he organized an all-black regiment of the Charlotte Light Infantry within the North Carolina National Guard in 1887 and served as captain of the regiment. Upon the outbreak of the Spanish–American War, the regiment became absorbed into the Third North Carolina Regiment and was assigned to Company A of the regiment on April 1, 1898. Taylor was later promoted to Lieutenant Colonel of the regiment.

Personal life
He married twice in his life as he initially married Augusta Wheeler in 1869 and would have three sons with her but after her death in 1904, Taylor married Ella Louise Pickens in 1905 and would have an extra two daughters with her. They also assumed custody of James Franklin Richardson who was the general assemblyman and North Carolina state senator within Mecklenburg County, North Carolina. Taylor was a member of the Independent Order of Odd Fellows, the Benevolent and Protective Order of Elks and was a freemason.

Notes

References

1849 births
1934 deaths
People from Charlotte, North Carolina
United States Army officers
Military personnel from North Carolina
American firefighters
American ballroom dancers
Barbers
American military personnel of the Spanish–American War
North Carolina National Guard personnel
19th-century American slaves
Members of the Benevolent and Protective Order of Elks
American Freemasons
Members of the Odd Fellows